The following is a list of cities and largest towns in Myanmar 5,000 & bigger by UNFPA Myanmar. The capitals of states and regions in Myanmar are Bold.

List of cities by urban population

List of towns by urban population

Gallery

See also

References

External links 

 

 
Cities
Myanmar

simple:Myanmar#Largest cities